Thornwood High School is a public high school located in South Holland, Illinois, United States. It was built as part of Thornton Township High School District 205. It opened in 1971 to accommodate overcrowding at other District 205 schools, Thornridge High and Thornton Township High School.

Notable alumni
Freddie Banks – College football coach
Michael Blair – retired NFL football Running Back; played on the Cincinnati Bengals and Green Bay Packers
 Eddy Curry – Former NBA Center; played for the Chicago Bulls, New York Knicks, 2012 NBA Champion Miami Heat, and Dallas Mavericks
T. C. Dantzler – Greco-Roman wrestler; two-time U.S. national champion, five-time U.S. world wrestling team member
Matt Doherty – actor    
Floyd Fields – Former NFL football safety for the San Diego Chargers
Cliff Floyd – MLB baseball left-fielder; won 1997 World Series championship with Florida Marlins
Reggie Hamilton – Undrafted professional basketball player
Justin Huisman – Former MLB baseball pitcher; pitched for the Kansas City Royals
Don Holmes- Played Middle Linebacker for the Northwestern Wildcats; 1995 Big Ten Champion and participated in 1996 Rose Bowl; Currently the Principal of Thornwood High School  (2018–Present)
Mark Konkol – Reporter for Chicago Sun-Times; 2011 Pulitzer Prize recipient
Neil Magny – Wrestler, professional MMA fighter competing in UFC
David Jerard Moss – Professional basketball player
Mark Mulder – Former MLB baseball pitcher; pitched for the Oakland Athletics and St. Louis Cardinals
DJ Rashad – DJ, pioneer of Chicago footwork
Bill Roe – Former NFL football Linebacker
Reggie Torian – 1999 silver medalist in 110m hurdles at World Championships; NCAA indoor 60m hurdle record holder
Steve Trout – Former MLB baseball pitcher; pitched for the Chicago White Sox, Chicago Cubs, New York Yankees, and Seattle Mariners
Michelle Venturella – 2000 United States Olympic softball gold medalist
Jason Weaver – R&B singer and actor
Justin Williams – Former NBA basketball Power Forward-Center; currently plays in Italy

References

External links
Official site

Educational institutions established in 1972
Public high schools in Cook County, Illinois
South Holland, Illinois